Gudalur is a state assembly constituency in Nilgiris district in Tamil Nadu. Its State Assembly Constituency number is 109. It comes under 'The Nilgiris Lok Sabha constituency'. It was created from changes made to the Udagamandalam constituency in 1967 and was initially reserved for candidates from the Scheduled Castes. The reservation criteria ceased in 1977 but were reinstated for the 2011 elections. In between, the 2008 boundary changes had made it smaller. It is one of the 234 State Legislative Assembly Constituencies in Tamil Nadu, in India.

Members of the Legislative Assembly

Election results

2021

2016

2011

2006

2001

1996

1991

1989

1984

1980

1977

1971

1967

References 

 

Assembly constituencies of Tamil Nadu
Nilgiris district